The 1934 Tipperary Senior Hurling Championship was the 43rd staging of the Tipperary Senior Hurling Championship since its establishment by the Tipperary County Board in 1887.

Moycarkey-Borris won the championship after a 3–06 to 2–03 win over Kiladangan-Kilbarron in the final. It was the club's fourth title as Moycarkey-Borris but the eighth title to be claimed by a team representing the area.

References

Tipperary
Tipperary Senior Hurling Championship